This is a discography of D.R.I., an American crossover thrash band formed in 1982 by Kurt Brecht, Spike Cassidy, Dennis Johnson and Eric Brecht. D.R.I. currently consists of Kurt Brecht (lead vocals), Spike Cassidy (guitar and backing vocals), Harald Oimoen (bass), and Walter Ryan (drums). The band rose to prominence in the U.S. during the thrash metal era with their albums 4 of a Kind and Thrash Zone. The band has released seven studio albums, two EPs (one of which is a split with Raw Power), one compilation album and two live albums.

Before signing a record contract with Metal Blade Records in 1984, the band released their self-titled debut album in 1983 and the Violent Pacification EP a year later on the Dirty Rotten label. D.R.I. followed up with their second full-length album Dealing with It! in 1985, and Crossover two years later. In 1988, D.R.I. released 4 of a Kind which was their first album to chart on Billboard 200, reaching No. 116. Their follow-up album, Thrash Zone, peaked at No. 140 on the American charts and was their final album to chart in the US. D.R.I.'s chart success slowly fell throughout the 1990s until they released their last studio album to date Full Speed Ahead in 1995, which failed to chart in the US.

Since 1996, D.R.I. had continued touring and been going on hiatus sporadically. No new albums under the D.R.I. name have been released since 1995; however, a new demo track, "Against Me", was released as a digital download on their website in 2004, and an EP containing new music But Wait... There's More! was released twelve years later. There have been discussions of a new studio album, but it has never materialized.

Studio albums

Live albums

Compilation albums

Extended plays

References

Discographies of American artists
Heavy metal group discographies
Punk rock group discographies